Heerenveen is a town and municipality in the province of Friesland (Fryslân), in the Northern Netherlands. In 2021, the town had a population of 29,790 (1 January) while the municipality had a population 50,859 (1 July).

History 
The town was established in 1551 by three lords as a location for the purpose of digging peat which was used for fuel, hence the name (heer is "lord", veen is "peat"). Heerenveen was not one of the traditional eleven cities in Friesland (Fryslân) as it did not have so-called city rights.  However, it is now one of the larger municipalities of the province.

The windmill Welgelegen or Tjepkema's Molen is the only survivor of seventeen which have stood in Heerenveen.

Population centres 
Population as of 1 January 2018:

Heerenveen (32,900), Akkrum (3406), Aldeboarn (1479), Bontebok (445), De Knipe (1470), Gersloot (280, together with Gersloot-Polder), Hoornsterzwaag (815), Jubbega (3510), Katlijk (630), Luinjeberd (450), Mildam (740), Nes (1104), Nieuwebrug (210), Nieuwehorne (1500), Nieuweschoot (180), Oranjewoud (1610), Oudehorne (840), Oudeschoot (1480), Terband (265) and Tjalleberd (800).

Hamlets 
The hamlets are: Anneburen, Birstum, Brongergea, Easterboarn, Jinshuzen, Meskenwier, Oude Schouw (partially), Pean, Poppenhúzen, Schurega, Soarremoarre, Spitsendijk, Sythuzen, Warniahúzen en Welgelegen (partially).

Museums 
 Museum Belvédère, modern art and contemporary art
 Museum Heerenveen, local history and culture

Transport 
Railway station: Heerenveen

Local government

Sports 

Heerenveen is famous for its sporting accomplishments and world class sports accommodations. These include the Abe Lenstra football stadium and the Thialf speed skating arena which was one of the first indoor 400m ice rinks in the world, and where annually held international events draw large crowds. Thialf is also home to the city's ice hockey team, the Heerenveen Flyers.
The town's football team, SC Heerenveen, plays in the first tier and has been a steady presence in the Europa League, topped by the team's biggest achievement when they qualified for the UEFA Champions League in 2000.
In 2006, the "Sportstad" (Sport City) project was completed, which included a gymnastics hall, swimming pool and an extension to the football stadium, all of which are clustered together. The Abe Lenstra stadium is unusual because its supporter capacity is larger than the number of inhabitants of the town. One of the few football venues that shares this distinction is Stade Félix Bollaert in Lens, France. Several American football venues, mostly college football venues, also share this distinction.

Notable residents

 Wilhelm Heinrich, Duke of Saxe-Eisenach (1691 in Oranjewoud – 1741) a Duke of Saxe-Eisenach
 Suzanne Manet (born 'Leenhoff', 1829–1906), pianist and opera singer, wife of Édouard Manet
 Geerhardus Vos (1862–1949), a Dutch-American Calvinist theologian of the Princeton Theology
 Cissy van Marxveldt (1889 in Oranjewoud – 1948) a Dutch writer of children's books
 Albert Gillis von Baumhauer (1891–1939) a Dutch aviation pioneer, designed the first Dutch helicopter 
 Eelco van Kleffens (1894–1983) a Dutch politician and diplomat
 Herman Zanstra (1894 in Schoterland – 1972) a Frisian/Dutch astronomer
 Fedde Schurer (1898–1968), journalist, poet and politician and poet in the West Frisian language
 Adrianus van Kleffens (1899–1973) a judge at the European Court of Justice 1952/1958 
 Klaas Runia (1926 in Oudeschoot – 2006) a Dutch theologian, churchman and journalist
 Wim Duisenberg (1935–2005), politician and President of the European Central Bank 1998/2003 
 T. S. van Albada (born 1936 in Akkrum) a Dutch astronomer and academic
 Gretta Duisenberg (born 1942) a Dutch pro-Palestinian political activist
 Jacob de Haan (born 1959), a Dutch contemporary composer known for wind music
 Tineke Postma (born 1978), a Dutch saxophonist
 Jan Huitema (born 1984), politician and Member of the European Parliament (MEP)

Sport 

 Abe Lenstra (1920–1985), a Dutch football player with 730 club caps
 Foppe de Haan (born 1943), football coach and politician
 Margriet Zegers (born 1954), a retired Dutch field hockey defender, team gold medallist at the 1984 Summer Olympics
 Franke Sloothaak (born 1958) a German show jumping Olympic champion
 Nico-Jan Hoogma (born 1968) a former football defender with 517 club caps
 Falko Zandstra (born 1971),  a former Dutch speed skater, silver medallist at the 1992 Winter Olympics and bronze medallist the 1994 Winter Olympics
 Carien Kleibeuker (born 1978) a Dutch long-distance speed skater, bronze medallist at the 2014 Winter Olympics 
 Epke Zonderland (born 1986), a gymnast and gold medallist at the 2012 Summer Olympics
 Sven Kramer (born 1986), long track speed skater, three time Olympic champion in the 5000 meters
 Vladislav Bykanov (born 1989) an Israeli Olympic short track speed skater, lives in Heerenveen
 Sanne Wevers (born 1991), an artistic gymnast, gold medallist at the 2016 Summer Olympics
 Antoinette de Jong (born 1995) a Dutch speed skater, bronze medallist at the 2018 Winter Olympics 
 Lisa Top (born 1996), a Dutch artistic gymnast
 Aafke Soet (born 1997), former short track speed skater, now cyclist
 Yasser Seirawan (born 1960), American/Syrian chess grandmaster and champion known for his excellent books and commentary on chess games, 
 Andries Noppert (born 1994), Dutch National Team Goalkeeper World Cup 2022.
 Anna-Maja Kazarian (born 7 January 2000) is a Dutch chess player who holds the titles of FIDE Master (FM) and Woman International Master.

Twin cities 
Heereveen's longstanding connection with Rishon LeZion, Israel ended in 2016 after the supporting organizations shut down in both countries.

Gallery

References

External links 

 

 
Municipalities of Friesland
Populated places in Friesland
Populated places established in 1551
1551 establishments in the Holy Roman Empire
16th-century establishments in the Netherlands